The American Miniature Horse is an American breed of small or miniature horse. It frequently has the appearance of either a small Arab or a small draft horse; genetically it is no different to pony breeds such as the Shetland.

History 

The American Miniature Horse was developed in the twentieth century. It appears to derive at least in part from animals brought to the USA from the United Kingdom. These may have included British and Dutch pit ponies imported in the late nineteenth century and used until the mid-twentieth century in the coal mines of the eastern and central United States, and some descendants of small horses bred in England in the first half of the twentieth century by Lady Estella Mary Hope and her sister Lady Dorothea. 

In 1972 the American Shetland Pony Club started a separate stud-book for the American Miniature, the American Miniature Horse Registry. A second breed association, the American Miniature Horse Association, was formed in 1978.

The American Miniature is widely distributed in the United States, and is also present in Germany and the United Kingdom.

Characteristics 

The American Miniature has been selectively bred to display in miniature the physical characteristics of a full-sized horse. It frequently has the appearance of either a small Arab or a small draft horse. Although its appearance is horse-like, it is genetically no different to pony breeds such as the Shetland.

Height is not measured to the withers, as is usual in horses, but to the root of the last hair of the mane.

All coat colors, eye colors, coat patterns and markings are equally acceptable for registration. Some colors that are rare in full-sized American horses are seen in the breed, such as bay silver dapple – light bay with white mane and tail and black legs.

References 

Horse breeds originating in the United States